David Ray Williams (born March 10, 1954) is a former professional American football running back in the National Football League (NFL) for the San Francisco 49ers and Chicago Bears. He also played for the Calgary Stampeders of the Canadian Football League (CFL). He played college football at the University of Colorado.

Early years
Williams attended Homer High School in Louisiana. He accepted a scholarship from the University of Colorado where he played as a quarterback. He also was a sprinter in track.

As a junior, he made 73 completions out of 139 attempts (52.5%) for 899 yards and 3 touchdowns, while rushing for 190 yards and 4 touchdowns. In his last year he had 103 completions out of 172 attempts (59.9%) for 1,282 yards and 7 touchdowns, while rushing for 572 yards and 7 touchdowns. He finished his career as the school's total offense record holder with 3,576 yards.

Professional career

Dallas Cowboys
Williams was selected by the Dallas Cowboys in the seventh round (208th overall) of the 1976 NFL Draft as an athlete, with the intention of playing him at running back, but he opted not to sign with the team.

Calgary Stampeders
On May 19, 1976, he was signed by the Calgary Stampeders of the Canadian Football League to play quarterback.

San Francisco 49ers
In 1977, he was signed by the San Francisco 49ers as a free agent. That season, he was a backup running back, but also returned one kickoff for a touchdown. The next year, he was used mostly on special teams as a kickoff returner. He was released on August 20, 1979.

Chicago Bears
On August 29, 1979, he was signed as a free agent by the Chicago Bears. He started 12 games at fullback after Roland Harper was lost for the year with a knee injury, while blocking for Walter Payton and registering 755 all-purpose yards. The next year, he returned to a backup and special teams role.

The biggest highlight of his career came on Thanksgiving Day 1980 against the Detroit Lions, when he returned the opening overtime kickoff 95 yards for a game-winning touchdown, completing a comeback from a 17–3 deficit. At the time, it was the shortest overtime in NFL history. In November 1981, he was placed on the injured reserve list with a fractured leg.

Personal life
His nephews Brock Williams and John Williams also played in the National Football League.

References

External links
Just Sports Stats

1954 births
Living people
Sportspeople from Minden, Louisiana
Players of American football from Louisiana
American football quarterbacks
Canadian football quarterbacks
American football running backs
American football return specialists
Colorado Buffaloes football players
Calgary Stampeders players
San Francisco 49ers players
Chicago Bears players